Pristimantis peraticus is a species of frog in the family Strabomantidae.
It is endemic to Colombia.
Its natural habitats are tropical moist montane forests and high-altitude grassland.
It is threatened by habitat loss.

References

peraticus
Endemic fauna of Colombia
Amphibians of Colombia
Amphibians of the Andes
Amphibians described in 1980
Taxonomy articles created by Polbot